Jennifer Gross may refer to:
 Jennifer Gross (basketball) (born c. 1975), American basketball coach
 Jennifer Gross (politician), member of the Ohio House of Representatives
 Jenny Gross, a fictional character from the Australian drama series Winners & Losers

See also
 Jen Gross, member of the Montana Senate